Sándor Noszály (8 March 1940 – 27 January 2001) was a Hungarian athlete. He competed in the men's high jump at the 1960 Summer Olympics.

References

External links
 

1940 births
2001 deaths
Athletes (track and field) at the 1960 Summer Olympics
Hungarian male high jumpers
Olympic athletes of Hungary
Sportspeople from Szabolcs-Szatmár-Bereg County